Victor Fourgeaud was a San Francisco doctor and legislator. He is known for his work on epidemic of diphtheria in California. Fourgeaud made use of acid for treatment of diphtheria, which was probably ineffective.

References

1815 births
1875 deaths
People from the San Francisco Bay Area